Prays moschettinella is a moth in the family Plutellidae.

External links
 Prays moschettinella at www.catalogueoflife.org.

Plutellidae